Garmsar Rural District is a rural district (dehestan) in Jebalbarez-e Jonubi District, Anbarabad County, Kerman Province, Iran. At the 2006 census, its population was 7,668, in 1,575 families. The rural district has 74 villages.

References 

Rural Districts of Kerman Province
Anbarabad County